Baghnarhesi is a  mountain of the Gagra Range in Abkhazia, Georgia.

Notes

References 

Baghnarhesi
Mountains of Abkhazia